Aliabad-e Katul (also Romanized as ‘Alīābād-e Katūl, Aliabad-e Katool, and Aliâbâd Katool; also known simply as Aliabad (also Romanized as ‘Alīābād) is a city and capital of Aliabad County, in Golestan Province, Iran. At the 2006 census its population was 46,183, in 11,676 families.

The city is sited on a hillside of the Alborz Mountains between Gorgan and Azad Shahr. The Kaboud-val waterfall is near the city. Nearby are the villages of Kholin Darreh, Chinou, Alestan, and Mayan.

The people of Aliabad speak a dialect of Mazanderani language called Katoli.

References 

Populated places in Aliabad County
Cities in Golestan Province